Elizabeth Boyle  may refer to:

Elizabeth Killigrew, Viscountess Shannon (1622–1680), married name Boyle, English courtier
Elizabeth Boyle, Countess of Guilford (died 1667), English peeress
Bess Boyle (1913–2000), American screenwriter